Yetide Badaki (born September 24, 1981) is a Nigerian-American actress. She is best known for playing Bilquis on the Starz series American Gods.

Early life
Badaki was born in Ibadan, Nigeria. Before moving to England, Badaki lived in Nigeria for three years. At the age of 6, she returned to Nigeria. Finally, she settled in America at age twelve. She is a graduate of McGill University with a major in English Literature (Theater) and a minor in Environmental Science. Badaki also has a Master of Fine Arts in Theatre from Illinois State University.

Career
Badaki received a 2006 Jeff Award nomination for Best Actress in a Principal Role (Play) for I Have Before Me a Remarkable Document Given to Me by a Young Lady from Rwanda. She has received positive reviews for her portrayal of Bilquis on American Gods. The character of Bilquis has had its role in the story expanded for the television series.  In 2018, Badaki played the recurring character Chi Chi on This Is Us.

Badaki has written a short film called In Hollywoodland, which she funded with IndieGoGo.  Badaki and Karen David produced and starred in the short film while  Jessica Sherif directed it.  In Hollywoodland is a re-imagining of Alice in Wonderland set in present-day Los Angeles.  In Hollywoodland premiered in August 2020 at the Bentonville Film Festival.

Badaki played the mother of Giannis Antetokounmpo in the 2022 biographical movie Rise for Disney Plus.

In 2023, Deadline announced that Badaki was developing a Nigerian vampire series titled Najia Vamp with Prentice Penny & Sebastian A. Jones. It will include a comic run and a TV series.

Personal life
She became a United States citizen in 2014. In 2021, Badaki revealed that she is bisexual.

Filmography

Film

Television

Video games

See also 

 List of Yoruba people
 List of Nigerian actresses

References

External links

 

American television actresses
Nigerian television actresses
Living people
Year of birth missing (living people)
Actresses from Ibadan
McGill University alumni
Illinois State University alumni
1981 births
Nigerian expatriates in the United Kingdom
Nigerian emigrants to the United States
People with acquired American citizenship
American people of Yoruba descent
Yoruba actresses
21st-century American actresses
American bisexual actors
Nigerian bisexual people
21st-century Nigerian LGBT people
21st-century American LGBT people
Bisexual women
Bisexual actresses
LGBT African Americans